The 2001–02 Boston College Eagles men's basketball team represented Boston College as a member of the Big East Conference during the 2001–02 NCAA Division I men's basketball season. Led by head coach Al Skinner, they played their home games at Conte Forum in Chestnut Hill, Massachusetts. The team finished fourth in the East division of the Big East regular season standings, lost in the semifinals of the Big East tournament, and received an at-large bid to the NCAA tournament. Playing as the No. 11 seed in the Midwest region, the Eagles were beaten by No. 6 seed Texas in the opening round. Boston College finished the season with a 20–12 (8–8 Big East) record.

Roster

Schedule and results 

|-
!colspan=9 style=| Regular season

|-
!colspan=9 style=| Big East tournament

|-
!colspan=9 style=| NCAA Tournament

Rankings

References

Boston College Eagles men's basketball seasons
Boston College
Boston College
Boston College Eagles men's basketball
Boston College Eagles men's basketball
Boston College Eagles men's basketball
Boston College Eagles men's basketball